The R709 road is a regional road in Waterford, Ireland. It forms the Inner Ring Road around the south of the inner city. It begins at the junction with the R680 at Cork Road and ends at the junction with the R683 at Newtown Road, and passes via the Inner Ring Road (purpose-built section), Richardson's Folly, Inner Ring Road (purpose-built section) and Passage Road.

The R710 forms the Outer Ring Road around the south of the city.

See also
Roads in Ireland

References
Roads Act 1993 (Classification of Regional Roads) Order 2006 – Department of Transport

Regional roads in the Republic of Ireland
Roads in County Waterford